Brunsdon is a British name. Notable people with this surname include:
John Brunsdon (born 1933), English printmaker
William Brunsdon Yapp (1909–1990), English zoologist and writer

It is also a rare first name:
Charles Brunsdon Fletcher (1859–1946), English-born Australian surveyor and journalist